Ego Game Technology Engine is a video game engine developed by Codemasters. While it is primarily used for racing games, it has also been used in a few first-person shooters.

Ego is a modified version of the Neon game engine that was used in Colin McRae: Dirt and was developed by Codemasters and Sony Computer Entertainment using Sony Computer Entertainment's PhyreEngine cross-platform graphics engine. The Ego engine was developed to render more detailed damage and physics as well as render large-scale environments.

Games using EGO

References

2007 software
Codemasters
Video game engines